Tony Dollinger (born October 18, 1962) played for the Detroit Lions briefly during the 1987 NFL season. He was a running back. At Evangel University he was a 1st team All-American, and the university’s first 3-time All-American in any sport as a 3-time All-American in football.

Website
Tony Dollinger

References

Sportspeople from Winter Park, Florida
People from Oconto, Wisconsin
Players of American football from Florida
Players of American football from Wisconsin
Evangel University alumni
American football running backs
1962 births
Living people
Dallas Cowboys players
Detroit Lions players
National Football League replacement players